Echo Night 2: Nemuri no Shihaisha is a 1999 survival horror first-person adventure video game developed and published by FromSoftware for the PlayStation. It is the second game in the Echo Night series. While it shares common elements with Echo Night, Echo Night 2 takes place in its own timeline. A fan translation was released in 2015, translating its title as Echo Night 2: The Lord of Nightmares.

Story 
The game is set in an old Gothic manor house.

Gameplay
Like the first game, Echo Night 2 is played from a first-person perspective, but unlike most other first-person games there is no use of firearms in the game. When confronted by a ghost the player must turn on the lights in the room by means of a light switch. The player is often transported into the past via the passengers or certain objects. Once the player fulfills a task important to a spirit they will vanish and drop an "Astral Piece" which can be used to get a different ending scene.

Release
The game was released for the Sony PlayStation on August 5, 1999, and published by FromSoftware. It was released only in Japan.

In 2007, it was re-released for the PlayStation Network in Japan.

In 2015, an English language fan translation was released.

Reception 
Japanese gaming publication Famitsu gave it a score of 32 out of 40.

Notes

References

External links

1999 video games
First-person adventure games
FromSoftware games
Video games about ghosts
Japan-exclusive video games
PlayStation (console) games
PlayStation (console)-only games
1990s horror video games
Video games developed in Japan
Video games scored by Keiichiro Segawa
Video games with alternate endings
Single-player video games